Eugenio Galliussi (18 July 1915 – 14 November 2010) was an Italian racing cyclist. He rode in the 1947 Tour de France.

References

External links
 

1915 births
2010 deaths
Italian male cyclists
People from Cividale del Friuli
Cyclists from Friuli Venezia Giulia